The Roald Amundsen Memorial by Sigvald Asbjørnsen is installed in San Francisco's Golden Gate Park, in the U.S. state of California. It honours Norwegian polar explorer Roald Amundsen, the first person to the South Pole.

External links
 

Golden Gate Park
Monuments and memorials in California
Outdoor sculptures in San Francisco
Sculptures of men in California